Alfred Scharf (25 November 1900, Kynšperk nad Ohří – 20 December 1965, London) was a German-born British art historian.

Early life
Scharf was a son of Heinrich Scharf (1872–1933), founder of the company Goldring (audio equipment) and his wife Cecilia, b. Presser (1876–1946). 
He graduated from Kaiser-Wilhelm-Realgymnasium in Berlin in 1920 and studied art history, classical archeology, East Asian art history and theater history in Berlin, Munich and Freiburg from 1920 to 1925. In 1925 he promoted as Dr. phil. in Freiburg with a work supervised by Hans Jantzen on history of stage design.

Career
From 1925 to 1928, Scharf worked as research assistant at Kupferstichkabinett department of Berlin State Museums, Kaiser Friedrich Museum and Kunstbibliothek. During his time at the Kupferstichkabinett he took part in the work of the catalog of Dutch masters.

From 1928 to 1932, Scharf worked as a freelance writer, among others as editor of the magazine Der Cicerone and Weltkunst. His plans to habilitate with a postdoctoral dissertation on Filippino Lippi at the University of Frankfurt failed because of his Jewish descent and the anti-semitic currents at the University of Frankfurt.

He then emigrated to Great Britain in May 1933, where he settled with the help of Jewish aid organizations and the SPSL. In 1933–34 he gave lectures at the Courtauld Institute of the University of London. He then worked as a freelance art expert and consultant. He played a seminal role in the early stage of the Census of Antique Works of Art and Architecture Known in the Renaissance at the Warburg Institute in London. He also worked for the National Art Collection Fund. In 1946 he was naturalized as a British citizen.

In the spring of 1940, Reichsicherheitshauptamt, in Berlin, placed him on the special search list GB due to his expertise as an art historian. This was a list of persons who, in the event of a successful invasion and occupation of the British Isles by the Wehrmacht, should be identified and arrested with particular priority.  Further detail may be found on this aspect of his life, and others, in an episode of the BBC programme 'Fake or Fortune?' https://www.youtube.com/watch?v=Sjdu1qiN93I  Following the end of the Second World War, he continued his work as a consultant, and also as an art dealer.

Scharf's focus was on Italian painting of the fifteenth century, Dutch and Flemish painting of the 17th century, as well as drawings and graphics from the 15th to the 18th century.

Family
Scharf was married to Felicie Radziejewski, who, as an art historian, published Felicie Scharf under her own name and worked as an art dealer from 1966 onwards. Their only daughter, Ursula, was born in 1930.  She married David Price in 1955.  They had two children, Martin (born 1957) and Stephanie (born 1958; known as Steffie).

Selected publications
 Beiträge zur Geschichte des Bühnenbildes vom fünfzehnten bis zum Ende des siebzehnten Jahrhunderts, Freiburg 1925 (Dissertation)
 Literaturberichte über die italienische Malerei des 15. Jahrhunderts, in: Zeitschrift Kunstgeschichte 1, 1932.
 Mitarbeit: Gustav Glück Gesammelte Aufsätze. Hrsg. v. Ludwig Burchard und Robert Eigenberger, Wien 1933.
 Mitarbeit an: Rembrandt. Handzeichnungen, Bd. 2, Hrsg. v. Wilhelm Reinhold Valentiner, 1933.
 Die frühen Gemälde des Raffaellino del Garbo, in: Jahrbuch der Preußischen Kunstsammlungen 54, 1933, pp. 151–166.
 Little-known Drawings by Rubens, in: Connoisseur 92, 1933, pp. 249–255.
 Neues zu Bacchiacca, in: Festschrift für Walter Friedlaender zum 60. Geburtstag. 1933.
 Tondi von Filippino Lippi, in: Pantheon, 1933, pp. 329–335.
 Zur Kunst des Francesco Pesellino, in: Pantheon, 14, 1934, pp. 211–220.
 Filippino Lippi, Wien 1935.
 Ruben's Portraits of Charles V and Isabella, in: Burlington Magazine 66, 1935, S. 259–266.
 Dutch and Flemish Painting at the Brussels, Amsterdam and Rotterdam Exhibitions, in: Connoisseur 1935 II, S. 247–255.
 Noch eine unbekannte Voltairebüste von Houdon, in: Pantheon 15, 1935, S. 199.
 Note on the Exhibition of Flemish Primitives at Rotterdam, in: Apollo 1936.
 Bacchicacca. A New Contribution in: Burlington Magazine 70, 1837, pp. 60–66.
 Two neglected Works by Fillippino Lipp, in: Burlington Magazine 71, 1937, pp. 4–7.
 Giorgione in the Light of New Research, in: Apollo 29, 1939, pp. 287–289.
 Luca Signorelli. Study of a Young Warrior, in: O.M. Drawings 14, 1939–1940, p. 50.
 The Massacre of Innocents by G.M. Cresp, in: Burlington Magazine 77, 1940, p. 3f.
 The Devonshire Collection, in: Burlington Magazine 90, 1948, pp. 354–357.
 Notes on the High Altar from Sta. Maria Novella at Florence, in: Burlington Magazine 91, 1948, pp. 214–217.
 mit Rosy Schilling: Zürich, Kunstschätze der Lombardei. Ausstellung im Kunsthaus, in: Phoebus 2, 1948–49, pp. 181–191.
 De Verzameling Devonshire te Londen tentoongesteld, in: Maandblad voor beeldende kunsten 25, 1949, pp. 65–69.
 Once more Monsú, in: Architectural Review 105, 1949.
 The Fantastic Visions of Monsú Desiderio, 1950.
 Francesco Desiderio, in: Burlington Magazine 92, 1950, pp. 18–22
 A Catalogue of Pictures and Drawings from the Collection of Sir Thomas Merton, 1950.
 The Rovinson Collection, in: Burlington Magazine 100, 1958, pp. 299–304.
 Raphael and the Getty Madonna, in: Apollo 79, 1964, pp. 114–121.

References

People from Kynšperk nad Ohří
1900 births
1965 deaths
German art historians
British art historians
Sudeten German people
Emigrants from Nazi Germany to the United Kingdom